Ma Qizhi (born November 1943) is a Chinese politician who served as chairman of Ningxia from 1997 to 2007. Ma was a member of the 14th and 16th Central Committee of the Chinese Communist Party and an alternate member of the 15th Central Committee of the Chinese Communist Party. He was a member of the Standing Committee of the 11th National People's Congress.

Biography
Ma was born into a Hui family in Jingyuan County, Ningxia, in November 1943, during the Republic of China. In 1963, he entered Central University for Nationalities, and forced to work in the Beidahuang 3168 Troops after graduation in 1968. He was a teacher at Angang Yucheng Middle School in October 1969 and Yinchuan No. 2 Middle School in March 1970.

He joined the Chinese Communist Party (CCP) in 1972. Beginning in March 1973, he served in several posts in the Ningxia Hui Autonomous Region Committee of the Communist Youth League of China, including deputy director, secretary-general, and deputy secretary. He was deputy party secretary of Guyuan in June 1983, and held that office until October 1985, when he became deputy head of the Organization Department of the CCP Ningxia Hui Autonomous Regional Committee. He was appointed deputy party secretary of Yinnan (now Wuzhong) in September 1988, concurrently holding the governor position. He was made head of the Propaganda Department of the CCP Ningxia Hui Autonomous Regional Committee in March 1991 and was admitted to member of the Standing Committee of the CCP Ningxia Hui Autonomous Regional Committee, the region's top authority. He was elevated to deputy party secretary of Ningxia in April 1993. In December 1997, he took office as chairman of Ningxia, and held the position for ten years. He became vice chairperson of the National People's Congress Agriculture and Rural Affairs Committee, and soon was appointed chairperson of the National People's Congress Ethnic Affairs Committee in March 2008.

References

1968 births
Living people
People from Guyuan
Hui people
Minzu University of China alumni
People's Republic of China politicians from Ningxia
Chinese Communist Party politicians from Ningxia
Members of the 14th Central Committee of the Chinese Communist Party
Alternate members of the 15th Central Committee of the Chinese Communist Party
Members of the 16th Central Committee of the Chinese Communist Party
Members of the Standing Committee of the 11th National People's Congress
Chairpersons of the National People's Congress Ethnic Affairs Committee